2019 was the 8th year in the history of RXF, the largest mixed martial arts promotion based in Romania.

List of events

RXF 34
 

RXF 34: Brașov was a mixed martial arts event that took place on May 13, 2019 at the Dumitru Popescu Arena in Brașov, Romania.

Results

RXF 35
 

RXF 35: Sibiu was a mixed martial arts event that took place on September 23, 2019 at the Las Vegas Casino in Sibiu, Romania.

Results

RXF 36
 

RXF 36: VIP Edition was a mixed martial arts event that took place on November 4, 2019 at the Berăria H in Bucharest, Romania.

Results

RXF 37
 

RXF 37: All Stars was a mixed martial arts event that took place on December 16, 2019 at the Sala Polivalentă in Bucharest, Romania.

Results

See also 
 2019 in Romanian kickboxing

References

External links
RXF
 

2019 in mixed martial arts
Real Xtreme Fighting events